Phebalium filifolium, commonly known as slender phebalium, is a species of upright, rounded shrub that is endemic to Western Australia. It has smooth branchlets covered with silvery scales, more or less cylindrical leaves with silvery scales on the lower side and pale to bright yellow flowers arranged in umbels of between three and eight on the ends of branchlets.

Description
Its branchlets are smooth and covered with silvery, scale-like hairs. The flowers are pale to bright yellow and borne in umbels of three to eight. Flowering occurs from September to December.

Taxonomy
Phebalium filifolium was first formally described in 1863 by Nikolai Turczaninow in Bulletin de la Société Impériale des Naturalistes de Moscou from specimens collected by James Drummond.

Distribution and habitat
This phebalium grows on sandy and gravelly soils and is found between Dalwallinu, Menzies, Katanning and the Cape Arid National Park in Western Australia.

Conservation status
This phebalium is classified as "not threatened" by the Government of Western Australia Department of Parks and Wildlife.

References

filifolium
Flora of Western Australia
Plants described in 1852
Taxa named by Nikolai Turczaninow